"Resignation Superman" is the first track and lead single released from Colorado rock band Big Head Todd & the Monsters' album Beautiful World. Released in 1997, it is the band's fourth song to reach the Billboard Mainstream Rock chart.

Written by frontman Todd Park Mohr, the lyrics appear to deal with a hero who, having "turned his cape in," decides to forsake the world and all of its troubles in order to settle down and live his own life.  A music video was made, which features the band performing the song in an open field interspersed with scenes of a football game.

1997 songs
1997 singles
Big Head Todd and the Monsters songs
Giant Records (Warner) singles